Ruth Keggin is a Manx Gaelic singer-songwriter. She holds degrees from the University of York and the University of Cambridge.

Career
In 2011, as a member of Nish As Rish, Keggin won in the Best Newcomers category at the 2011 Festival Interceltique de Lorient in Brittany, France.

Keggin was awarded a grant by Culture Vannin to produce her 2014 debut solo album, Sheear ("Westward"), a collection of traditional and contemporary Manx songs praised as "bringing new life into the language with her music." Keggin's album has held popularity in the Celtic genre, becoming album of the week on Celtic Music Radio and listed as number one in Japan’s ‘Top 10’.

Keggin released her second solo album, Turrys ("Journey"), in 2016. Critic Neil McFadyen, writing for the journal Folk Radio UK, praised the album and called her voice "clear, precise and a joy to hear."

In September 2020 Keggin became the Manx Language Development Officer for Culture Vannin, a foundation established by the government of the Isle of Man to promote Manx culture.

In March 2021, Keggin and Scottish harpist Rachel Hair launched a joint crowdfunding campaign to produce a debut duo album to consist primarily of songs in the Manx language. These will include both traditional songs and songs by contemporary Manx musicians. They reached their target goal of £5,000 within 12 hours of launching the campaign and achieved a stretch goal of £10,000 after 48 hours. Some matching funds were provided by Creative Scotland. The album has also received funding from the Isle of Man Arts Council.

Current and Former Collaborators

 Erlend Apneseth - hardanger fiddle
 Tom Callister - fiddle
 David Kilgallon 
 Vanessa McWilliam - double bass
 Margit Myhr - voice, hardanger fiddle
 Eoghan Ó Ceannabháin - Irish flautist and sean-nós singer
 David Pearce - guitar
 Rachel Hair - harp

Discography

See also
Julie Fowlis, sings in Scottish Gaelic
Mary Black, sings in Irish
Gwenno Saunders, sings in Welsh and Cornish

References

External links

Manx musicians
Manx language activists
Celtic folk musicians
1989 births
Living people